The 1890 Kansas vs. Baker football game was an American college football game between the Kansas Jayhawks football team of the University of Kansas and the Baker Methodists football (now nicknamed the Wildcats) team of Baker University played on November 22, 1890 in Baldwin City, Kansas. The game ended with Baker winning 22–9.  It was the first college football game played in the state of Kansas.

See also
 1890 college football season
 Timeline of college football in Kansas
 List of the first college football game in each US state

References

1890 college football season
vs. Baker 1890
vs. Kansas 1890
1890 in sports in Kansas
November 1890 sports events